The Jacksonville Dolphins women's basketball team represents Jacksonville University in women's college basketball. The Dolphins compete in the ASUN Conference, and play their home games at the Historic Swisher Gym on campus of Jacksonville University.

History
The Dolphins began play in 1999. In the 2015–16 season, the Dolphins won their first ever conference tournament, beating regular season champ Florida Gulf Coast 56–54. In the First Round in the NCAA Tournament, they lost 77–41 to South Carolina.

References

External links